White Terror is the name of several episodes of mass violence in history, carried out by conservative or nationalist groups against anarchists, communists, socialists, liberals, revolutionaries, or other opponents. It is sometimes contrasted with, and is the opposite of, a red terror. It may refer to:

History
Various anti-leftist acts of violence:
 First White Terror (1794–1795), a movement against the Jacobins in the French Revolution
 Second White Terror (1815), a movement against the French Revolution
 White Terror (Russia), a period of political repression, arrests and executions carried out by anti-Bolshevik forces during the Russian Civil War (1918–1922) and related conflicts
 White Terror (Bulgaria), the repression of the Communist September insurgency in the Kingdom of Bulgaria (1923)
 White Terror (Hungary), a two-year period (1919–1921) of repressive violence by counter-revolutionary soldiers
 White Terror (Spain), mass murders committed by the Nationalist movement during the Spanish Civil War and Francisco Franco's rule
 White Terror (mainland China), the period of political repression in China which was started in 1927 by the Republic of China/Kuomintang government
 White Terror (Taiwan), the period of political repression in Taiwan which was carried out during the years of 1949 to 1987 by the Republic of China/Kuomintang government
 White Terror (Greece), the persecution of the EAM-ELAS between the signing of the Treaty of Varkiza in February 1945 and the beginning of the Greek Civil War in March 1946
 White Terror (Finland), the repression which was committed by the White troops both during and after the Finnish Civil War in 1918

Film and television
 The White Terror (film), a 1917 silent German film
 Kenya: White Terror, a 2002 BBC documentary based on the work of Caroline Elkins

Other
 A common expression which is used to describe anonymous acts which are committed in order to create a climate of fear
 White terrorism, hate crimes and xenophobic acts of terrorism which are committed by white Americans or Europeans

See also
Anti-communist mass killings
Indonesian mass killings of 1965–1966
Mass killings under communist regimes
Red Terror (disambiguation)
Terror (disambiguation)